The following is a list of mayors of the municipality of Bayamón, Puerto Rico.

List of mayors

 José Ramírez de Arellano, circa 1772-1773
 Manuel de Guzmán, circa 1774
 Bernabé Dávila, circa 1775-1776
 Lucas de Fuentes, circa 1777-1799
 Juan Francisco de Fuentes, circa 1800-1802
 Tomás de Rivera, circa 1803
 Miguel Dávila, circa 1806
 Miguel Ramírez de Arellano, circa 1807
 Alonso Dávila, circa 1810
 Juan Francisco de Fuentes, circa 1812
 Francisco Ruiz and Peña, circa 1812-1813
 Luis Ramírez de Arellano, circa 1814
 Laureano Ramos, circa 1814
 Manuel de Villalba, circa 1818-1819
 Miguel de Andino, circa 1820
 Francisco Ruiz and Peña, circa 1820
 Alonso Dávila, circa 1821-1822
 Miguel de Andino, circa 1823-1824
 José Riguera, circa 1825-1826
 Pedro Vassallo, circa 1826
 Tomás Pacanins, circa 1827
 José de Rivera, circa 1828-1831
 Tomás Prieto, circa 1831
 Joaquín Goyena, circa 1832
 Miguel de Andino, circa 1837-1841
 Francisco de Paula Cepero, circa 1841-1843
 Antonio Padrón, circa 1843-1846
 Mariano Vassallo, circa 1847
 Tomás Prieto, circa 1847
 Ramón Suárez, circa 1849
 Arturo O’Neill, circa 1849
 Escolástico Fuentes, circa 1850
 Félix O’Neill, circa 1851-1852
 Andrés Vega, circa 1853
 Francisco Jiménez Prieto, circa 1856-1859
 Andrés Vega, circa 1860
 Francisco de Aguilar, circa 1861-1862
 Antonio de Aramburu, circa 1863-1864
 José Sicardó, circa 1864
 José Muñoz, circa 1867
 Andrés Vega, circa 1868
 Octavio Ortiz Zárate, circa 1870
 Eduardo Pardo, circa 1870
 G. Quiara, circa 1871
 Vicente Rodríguez, circa 1871
 Anastasio Maisonet, circa 1871-1872
 José Arvelo Calzadilla, circa 1874
 Marcial Colón, circa 1874-1875
 Manuel Fernández Umpierre, circa 1876-1879
 Bernardo Pérez, circa 1879-1880
 Manuel Capetillo, circa 1880-1881
 Manuel García Maitín, circa 1881-1883
 Bernardo Pérez, circa 1883-1884
 Eugenio Santaella and Cortón, circa 1884-1895
 José Alonso González, circa 1895-1897
 Manuel Valdés, circa 1897
 Félix Pérez Rivera, circa 1897-1898
 Juan Mateu García, circa 1898-1904
 Virgilio Dávila, 1905-1910

 Manuel Gaetán Barbosa, circa 1910-1911
 Rafael Díaz Cintrón, circa 1912-1914
 Ignacio Carballeira Cañellas, circa 1915-1918
 José Oller Díaz, circa 1919-1920
 Ramón Luis Rodríguez, circa 1920-1924
 Enrique Ponsa Parés, circa 1924-1928
 José Dolores Miranda, circa 1928-1933
 Juan C. Rodríguez, circa 1933-1934
 Angel Rivera Rodríguez, circa 1934-1944
 Rafael Torrech Genovés, circa 1945-1949
 Ramón Espinosa, circa 1949-1953
 Rafael Torrech Genovés, circa 1953-1961
 Julio "Tulio" López Corbera, circa 1961-1965
 Julio Castro Rodríguez, circa 1965-1969
 Guillermo Campos Ayala, circa 1969-1973
 Manuel Aponte Borrero, circa 1973-1977
 Ramón Luis Rivera, 1977-2001
 Ramón Luis Rivera Jr., 2001-current

See also
 Bayamón City Hall
 Timeline of Bayamón, Puerto Rico

References

bayamon